Robert Muczynski wrote Three Preludes for Unaccompanied Flute, Opus 18, in 1962, shortly after finishing his Sonata for Flute and Piano, Opus 14 (1960–61). Despite the title, Muczynski meant them to be encores.

According to the composer, the preludes fleetingly portray different moods, such as "jaunty, nocturnal, and free-wheeling". The word "jaunty" means "easy and sprightly in manner or bearing; smartly trim, as clothing". The word "nocturnal" means "of or relating to the night (opposed to diurnal); done, occurring, or coming at night; active at night". The word "freewheeling" means "operating in the manner of a freewheel; (of a person) moving about freely, independently, or irresponsibly; (of words, remarks, actions, etc.) unrestrained; irresponsible". The word "fleeting" means "passing swiftly; vanishing quickly; transient; transitory", and the transitive verb "portray" means "to make a likeness of by drawing, painting, carving, or the like; to depict in words; describe graphically; to represent dramatically, as on the stage".

Form
The three preludes are:

Allegro
Andante molto
Allegro molto

First Prelude

Second Prelude

Third Prelude

The piece uses accents to accentuate the off-beat rhythm.

References

Solo flute pieces
Muczynski
1962 compositions